Joseph (Joe) Thornton is an American Biologist.  He is a professor at the University of Chicago and a former Early Career Scientist of the Howard Hughes Medical Institute.  He is known for resurrecting ancestral genes and tracing the mechanisms by which proteins evolve new functions.

His work has been discussed in arguments concerning intelligent design and "irreducible complexity."  It has also been featured in popular discussions of the contingency of evolution.

Thornton has received the U.S. Presidential Early Career Award for Scientists and Engineers at the White House, as well as a Career Award from the National Science Foundation and an Early Career Scientist Award from the Howard Hughes Medical Institute.

His background and career were profiled in an article in the journal Nature, which focused on his unusual path into science, including undergraduate study as an English major and several  years as an environmental activist working for Greenpeace.

References

External links
 Thornton's University of Oregon web page
 Thornton's Howard Hughes Medical Institute web page
 National Institute of General Medical Sciences profile of Thornton
 Profile of Thornton in the journal Nature

1965 births
Living people
Evolutionary biologists
21st-century American biologists
Jewish American scientists
Yale University alumni
Columbia University alumni
University of Oregon faculty
21st-century American Jews